Union High School is an American public high school in Vancouver, Washington. It is part of the Evergreen Public Schools school district. While the campus is located within the proper city limits of Vancouver, it has a Camas area zip code. The campus was completed in July 2007. Union High School's principal is Griffin Peyton. The school colors are black, silver, and red. The school's mascot is the Titan.

About
Union opened in the fall of 2007 with students consisting of only freshmen, sophomores, and a handful of juniors. The original Union High School was founded in 1910. James Blair was the first principal.

It is the fourth high school built in the Evergreen School District – Evergreen High School was the first, Mountain View High School was second, and Heritage High School was the third. The four high schools share one football stadium, McKenzie Stadium, which is adjacent to Evergreen High School.

The school and campus were developed with the concept of utilizing contemporary educational technology. The design collaboration for the school won it a 2007 Community Development Department Community Pride Design award.

In June 2010 Newsweek magazine listed Union High School in its annual list of “America’s Best High Schools,” which includes 1,600, or about 6 percent, of the nation's high schools. UHS was listed 572nd nationally and 8th out of 32 high schools listed in the state of Washington.

Sports
The Union football team is one of the school's most prominent athletic teams. They had a record of 6-3 in their first year without seniors. In 2008, the undefeated Titans lost to Bellevue High School in the 3A state championship game. The Titans won 3A GSHL league titles in 2008, and 2009. The Titans earned 2nd place 4A GSHL titles in 2010, 2011, 2012 and 2013 and finished 1st in 2017 and 2018. In 2018 the undefeated Titans beat Lake Stevens High School 52-20 in the 4A state championship, receiving their first state title in football.

Union's wrestling team are five-time Clark County champions, five-time GSHL league champions, six-time district champions, and three-time regional champions. In 2011, Titan wrestling took the team title at the prestigious Pacific Coast Championships, and in 2012 and 2014 they won state trophies, placing 4th and 3rd respectively. Union's individual state champions include Clint Coulter (2010), John "Junior" Godinho (2014), Alex Berfanger (2014) and two-time state champs Dan Snediker and Ethan Rowton.

The cheer squad also placed 2nd at state.

Union's track and field has seen many accomplishments in its short history. In its first year, the track team finished second at state.

The Union Titans softball team were league, district and regional champs, and then took 3rd in state.

The Union Titans boys' basketball program is among the finest in the state, having won or competed in state championships nearly every year. The 2017 varsity boys' team won 2nd place in the state's 4A division.

The Union Titans girls' golf team won the 3A league and district titles in 2010. In the 4A classification they took district in 2011, and league and district titles in 2012.

The Union girls soccer team won the 4A GSHL league and district championship in 2019. They had an undefeated season in 2019 and they advanced to the state quarterfinals.

Campus
The Union High School Campus has five different site-built buildings which house the four different academic academies and the Student Commons, and a large modular unit. The five campus buildings are the Leadership and Business building (100), the Engineering and Environmental Sciences building (200), International Studies and Athletics building (300), the Visual and Performing Arts building (400), and the Student Union (500). The last building (600) is a multi-use building housing such programs as American Sign Language and Dance. Each building excluding the Student Union contains the basic core classes including math, general science, and English. Each building also contains specialty classes specific to that building.

Every classroom throughout all the buildings has a common set of technology resources installed, including a video projector, a document camera, and speech amplification system for teachers.

Union High School also features wireless hot spots which cover the entire campus. Students can use the campus Wi-fi system to connect to their student district computer account, and access school computer resources, to work on school assignments without the need to check into a school computer lab.

Academics
Union follows the Small Learning Communities model of learning environment. Students may choose a thematic focus community, such as performing arts or math and sciences, which allows them to better focus on areas of interest.

UHS Band
The Union High School Band Program is directed by Adam Morrell and Timothy Siess. Since its first year with 120 students, the program has grown to serve over 200 students and offers a wide variety of musical opportunities. The program includes Concert Band, Symphonic Band, 2 Jazz Ensembles (I & II), Percussion Ensemble, Chamber Music/Wind Ensemble, Football Band, Basketball Band, Marching Band, Pit Orchestra, and instrument choirs. Students in the program are active in honors ensembles such as the Portland Youth Philharmonic, All-State and All-Northwest ensembles/orchestras. Student-run ensembles and solos compete at state championships at Central Washington University every year, often winning 1st, 2nd, or 3rd place in the state. Union Band has won awards for being among the highest average GPA band programs in the state. The program's fundamental emphasis continues to be excellence on and off the stage.

Program highlights
 2016 Music for All National Festival - one of 16 bands in the country selected as a "featured ensemble"
 2013 National Association for Music Education NW Division Conference Performance
 2012 Music for All National Festival - one of 16 bands in the country selected as a "featured ensemble"
 2010, 2011, 2013, 2016, 2017 and 2019 Portland Rose Festival Starlight Parade Champions
 2012 and 2014 Portland Rose Festival Grand Floral Parade Champions
 2010 Midwest Clinic Performance
 2010 WMEA State Conference Performance
 2010, 2011, 2012, 2013, 2016 and 2017 Washington State Champions, Large Percussion Ensemble
 2010, 2011, 2012, 2016 Washington State Champions, Small Percussion Ensemble
 Best Jazz Ensemble, 2010-2013 Oregon Jazz Festival, 2008 and 2014 Vancouver BC Heritage Festival, 2011 Seattle Heritage Festival, 2009 San Francisco Heritage Festival

UHS Choir
The Union High School Choir program is directed by Joel Karn, previously the choral director at Heritage High School. Under his direction and accompanied by Lori Collier, Union won its first WIAA Sanctioned State Championship with the Union High School Select Men's Ensemble in the spring of 2008. They performed Joseph Martin's "The Awakening" and Bruce Sled's "Jing-Ga-Lye-Ya" to a standing ovation.

In 2009 the Men's Ensemble won the State Solo and Ensemble Contest again, making them the first high school in the state of Washington to win two championships consecutively in their first two years of existence. They performed "Viva Tutti," a traditional English glee, "Weep No More" by David Childs, and "Dubinushka (Russian Hammer Song)" by Vijay Singh. Their picture was featured on the front cover of the State Solo & Ensemble Booklet because of their unique story.

The Chamber Choir, the only mixed choir at Union High School, was invited to perform at the 2013 national American Choral Director's Association conference in Dallas, Texas. They were one of 30 choirs selected to perform and the only high school choir out of four total to be invited to perform in evening concerts at the Meyerson Symphony Center and Winspear Opera House. The set they sang to standing ovations both nights included Vijay Singh's "Surrexit Pastor Bonus", Stanford E. Scriven's "Christ the Appletree", J. Michael Saunders' "La Otra", Ethan Sperry's "Albela Sajan", an Indian raga, and John Muehleisen's set of "Aversion to Carrots" and "RAH!"

Program highlights
 2014 WIAA State Champions, Large Men's Ensemble
 2013 National ACDA Performance
 2013 WIAA State Champions, Large Men's Ensemble and Large Mixed Ensemble
 2012 WIAA State Champions, Large Men's Ensemble, Large Women's Ensemble, and Small Mixed Ensemble
 2011 MENC All-Northwest Conference Performance
 2010 WIAA State Champions, Large Men's Ensemble
 2009 WIAA State Champions, Large Men's Ensemble
 2008 WIAA State Champions, Large Men's Ensemble

Notable alumni
 Clint Coulter, outfielder for the Milwaukee Brewers organization
 Daniel Seavey, member of Why Don't We
 Jordan Chatman, basketball player
 Zach Collier and Reed Perkins, members of the folk/rock band Michael Barrow & The Tourists
Ricky Simón, professional mixed martial arts fighter, former LFA Bantamweight Champion, currently in the UFC

References

External links
 

Educational institutions established in 2007
2007 establishments in Washington (state)
High schools in Clark County, Washington
Public high schools in Washington (state)
High schools in Vancouver, Washington